Vitaliy Volodymyrovych Kvartsyanyi (born 19 July 1953) is a Ukrainian football manager and former player. Throughout his career he was mainly associated with Volyn Lutsk.

External links
Interview 
 

1953 births
Footballers from Lutsk
Living people
Lutsk Pedagogical Institute alumni
Soviet footballers
Ukrainian footballers
FC Volyn Lutsk players
Soviet Second League players
Soviet football managers
Ukrainian football managers
Ukrainian Premier League managers
Ukrainian First League managers
Ukrainian Second League managers
FC Volyn Lutsk managers
FC Podillya Khmelnytskyi managers
FC Metalurh Zaporizhzhia managers
FC Kryvbas Kryvyi Rih managers
KSZO Ostrowiec Świętokrzyski managers
FC Tavria-Skif Rozdol managers
Soviet Second League managers
II liga managers
Ukrainian football chairmen and investors
Ukrainian expatriate football managers
Expatriate football managers in Poland
Ukrainian expatriate sportspeople in Poland
Association football midfielders